Ilias Armodoros' (born on January 25, 1960) is a Greek former professional footballer who played as a left back and manager.

Club career
Armodoros started football at the age of 14 from the amateur club of Agios Dimitrios in Piraeus and in the summer of 1977 he was transferred to Ethnikos Piraeus. He made his debut as an amateur in the 1977–78 season, when there was a strike by professional footballers and from the following year he was permanently in the team as a regular. He remained in the Piraeus' club for 8 years and in the summer of 1985 he signed for AEK Athens. In the summer of 1987, he was acquired by the newly promoted Levadiakos, with whose colors he played for four years and ended his career in 1991. Armodoros played in total 304 games in the league. He also was in all the national team's derpartments, except the men's.

Managerial career
After the end of his playing career he worked as a coach for teams in all three divisions of Greece.

After football
On January 3, 2020, the Board of Directors of the National OFPF unanimously decided to entrust the responsibility of the men's football department to Armodoros and the partners of his choice.

Personal life
Armodoros comes from a sports family in Piraeus, since his father, Giorgos was a football referee in the first division and his grandmother's brother, Mimis Pasalaris was one of the founders of Ethnikos Piraeus in 1923. In recent years he has been involved in the trade of sporting goods.

References

1960 births
Living people
Agios Dimitrios F.C. players
Ethnikos Piraeus F.C. players
AEK Athens F.C. players
Levadiakos F.C. players
Association football defenders
Atromitos F.C. managers
Panelefsiniakos F.C. managers
Panachaiki F.C. managers
Levadiakos F.C. managers
Ethnikos Asteras F.C. managers
Footballers from Piraeus
Greek football managers
Greek footballers